Bohumil Kněžek (27 October 1900 – 25 September 1979) was a Czech architect. His work was part of the architecture event in the art competition at the 1936 Summer Olympics.

References

1900 births
1979 deaths
20th-century Czech architects
Olympic competitors in art competitions